Phryneta histrix is a species of beetle in the family Cerambycidae. It was described by Hintz in 1913. It is known from Uganda.

References

Endemic fauna of Uganda
Phrynetini
Beetles described in 1913